José Islas Rodríguez (born March 12, 1985) is a Mexican football manager and former player. He was born in Yahualica de González Gallo, Jalisco.

Islas played in Liga MX for Querétaro, Irapuato and Tijuana before joining Ascenso MX side Real Colima in 2009. He finished his playing career with Celaya F.C.

After he retired from playing, Islas became a football manager. He worked with his former club's second team, Celaya F.C. Premier, in the semi-professional third-tier before being named the senior side's manager in December 2018.

References

1985 births
Living people
Association football defenders
Querétaro F.C. footballers
Irapuato F.C. footballers
Club Tijuana footballers
Club Celaya footballers
Leones Negros UdeG footballers
Ascenso MX players
Mexican football managers
Club Celaya managers
Footballers from Jalisco
Mexican footballers